Kellogg is an English surname (originally Kyllehog, a pork butcher) which may refer to:

 Albert Kellogg (1813–1887), American physician and botanist
 Alice De Wolf Kellogg (1862–1900), American artist
 Brainerd Kellogg (1834–1920), American educationalist and writer
 Charles Kellogg (disambiguation), several people
 Charlotte Kellogg (1874–1960), American author and social activist
 Clara Louise Kellogg (1842–1916), American singer
 Clark Kellogg (born 1961), American sportscaster and former basketball player
 Daniel Kellogg (disambiguation), several people 
 Derek Kellogg (born 1973), American basketball coach
 Edward  Kellogg (disambiguation), several people
 Ella Eaton Kellogg (1853–1920), American philanthropist and pioneer in dietetics
 Fay Kellogg (1871–1918), American architect
 Francis L. Kellogg (1917–2006), American diplomat and prominent socialite
 Francis W. Kellogg (1810–1879), U.S. Representative from Michigan and Alabama
 Frank B. Kellogg (1856–1937), United States Secretary of State 1925–1929
 Henry T. Kellogg (1869–1942), American judge
 Jeff Kellogg (born 1961), American baseball umpire
 John Kellogg (disambiguation), several people
 Keith Kellogg (born 1944), American government official, retired army general
 Kendrick Bangs Kellogg (born 1934), American organic architect
 Louise P. Kellogg (1862–1942), American historian, writer, and educator
 Marjorie Kellogg (1922–2005), American author
 Mark Kellogg (reporter) (1831–1876), American newspaper reporter killed at the Battle of the Little Bighorn
 Mark Kellogg (musician), principal trombonist of the Rochester Philharmonic Orchestra, United States
 Mike Kellogg (American football) (born 1942), American football player
 Milo G. Kellogg, American electrical engineer, founder of Kellogg Switchboard & Supply Company
 Nelson A. Kellogg (1881–1945), American athlete, coach, and administrator
 Orlando Kellogg (1809–1865), U.S. Representative from New York
 Oliver Dimon Kellogg (1878–1932), American mathematician
 Paul Underwood Kellogg (1879–1958), American journalist and social reformer
 Peter Kellogg (born 1942), American businessman and philanthropist
 Ray Kellogg (1905–1976), American film director and producer
 Ray Kellogg (actor) (1919–1981), American film and television actor
 Remington Kellogg (1892–1969), American naturalist, director of the United States National Museum
 Rowland C. Kellogg (1843–1911), New York politician
 Samuel Kellogg (1673–1757), member of the Connecticut House of Representatives from Norwalk
 Stephen Wright Kellogg (1822–1904), American politician, attorney, military officer, and judge
 Stephen Kellogg of the band Stephen Kellogg and the Sixers
 Steven Kellogg (born 1941), American children's author and illustrator
 Vernon Lyman Kellogg (1867–1937), American entomologist, evolutionary biologist, and science administrator
 Virginia Kellogg (1907–1981), American film writer
 W. K. Kellogg (1860–1951), American industrialist, founder of the Kellogg Company
 William Kellogg (disambiguation), several people
 Winthrop Kellogg (1898–1972), American comparative psychologist

English-language surnames
Occupational surnames
English-language occupational surnames